Labdia notochorda is a moth in the family Cosmopterigidae. It was described by Edward Meyrick in 1907. It is found in Sri Lanka.

References

Labdia
Moths described in 1907